Järntorgsbrunnen (Swedish for The Well of the Iron Square), or using the artists title, De fem världsdelarna (The Five Continents), is a sculpture by Tore Strindberg, inaugurated October 12, 1927 at Järntorget, Göteborg, Sweden.

The sculpture consists of a granite fountain with five naked, female, bronze sculptures (by Tore Strindberg), representing five continents: Africa, America, Asia, Europe and Australia (Oceania). A ship at the top is seen sailing five streams, symbolizing the five oceans. Since the piece is to remind us of the old iron scale which used to be located on this spot (hence the square's name, The Iron Square), 30 hallmarks from those ironworks who exported their goods via Göteborg can be seen throughout the sculpture.

De fem världsdelarna (The Five Continents)

Buildings and structures in Gothenburg
Fountains in Sweden
Outdoor sculptures in Sweden
Bronze sculptures in Sweden
Granite sculptures